This is a list of music video games, sorted alphabetically. The table can be sorted by a different column via clicking on the small box next to column heading.

List

See also
Comparison of dance video games
List of artists who have portrayed themselves in music games
List of GuitarFreaks games

References

External links
Steam
US.PlayStation
Xbox
Amazon
eBay
GameTrailers
Rhythm Games ModDB IndieDB
GameSpot
IGN
KONAMI Game
Nintendo eShop All Wii U Games
The Anigraphical Etudes/ConcertGames
GuitarFreaks
Konami

Music